Kendra Vail Sharp is an American engineer. She is a professor of mechanical engineering and the Richard and Gretchen Evans Professor in Humanitarian Engineering at Oregon State University College of Engineering.

Education 
Sharp completed a bachelor of science at University of Illinois at Urbana–Champaign in 1993. In 1994, she completed a master of philosophy at University of Cambridge. Sharp earned a master of engineering from University of California, Berkeley in 1996. In 2001, she earned a doctor of philosophy from University of Illinois at Urbana–Champaign. Her dissertation was titled "Experimental investigation of liquid and particle -laden flows in microtubes." Sharp's doctoral advisor was Ronald Adrian.

Career 
Sharp joined the faculty at Oregon State University (OSU) in mechanical engineering in 2010. She is the director of the humanitarian engineering program at OSU. In 2015, Sharp was named the Richard and Gretchen Evans Professor of Humanitarian Engineering.

Sharp's expertise is in experimental fluid mechanics. She researches international development, applying technology to humanitarian engineering, and sustainable energy and water systems.

Awards and honors 
In 2018, Sharp received the Edwin F. Church Medal.

Personal life 
In graduate school, Sharp was married to David Hill.

References

External links
 

Living people
Year of birth missing (living people)
University of Illinois Urbana-Champaign alumni
Alumni of the University of Cambridge
UC Berkeley College of Engineering alumni
Oregon State University faculty
20th-century American engineers
21st-century American engineers
20th-century women engineers
21st-century women engineers
20th-century American women scientists
21st-century American women scientists